The Nagaland Express is a daily Express train which runs between Guwahati railway station in Guwahati, the capital city of Assam and Dibrugarh Town in Upper Assam. Earlier, the train ran between Guwahati and Dimapur. From 2020, it was extended to Dibrugarh Town.

Timetable
 From Guwahati to Dibrugarh Town (train number 15669) - departure from Guwahati (GHY) 20:45 IST; arrival at Dibrugarh Town (DBRT) 10:40 IST
 From Dibrugarh Town to Guwahati (15670)- departure from Dibrugarh Town (DBRT) 13:40 IST; arrival at Guwahati (GHY) 03:40 IST

References

3. ^15670/" Nagaland Express Train Live tracking"

4. Train last stop has extended from Dimapur in Nagaland to "Ledo in Assam". 

Transport in Dimapur
Transport in Guwahati
Rail transport in Assam
Rail transport in Nagaland
Named passenger trains of India
Express trains in India
Transport in Dibrugarh